Lubomír Lipský (19 April 1923 – 2 October 2015) was a Czech actor.

He was born in Pelhřimov, the brother of director Oldřich Lipský.  He died in Prague, aged 92.

Selected filmography

 V horách duní (1946) - Josef
 Premiera (1947)
 Ves v pohraničí (1948) - Lojza
 Kariéra (1948) - Cameraman
 Železný dědek (1948) - Vasek Kajdos - fireman
 Zrcadlo (1948)
 Červená ještěrka (1949) - Guide
 Divá Bára (1949) - Youngster
 Soudný den (1949) - Nozicka
 Výlet pana Broučka do zlatých časů (1949)
 Přiznání (1950)
 Vítězná křídla (1950)
 Slepice a kostelník (1951) - Sarl
 The Emperor and the Golem (1952) - Alchymista
 Racek má zpoždění (1952)
 Tajemství krve (1953) - Doctor at Lecture
 Kavárna na hlavní třídě (1954) - Editor
 Haškovy povídky ze starého mocnářství (1954)
 Cirkus bude! (1954) - hudební klaun Bedra
 Nejlepší člověk (1954) - Arnostek
 Byl jednou jeden král… (1955) - Brave prince - Son of Cannonglory VIII.
 Psohlavci (1955) - Muz ctoucí rozsudek
 Hudba z Marsu (1955) - Holoubek, referent SPKPL
 Návštěva z oblak (1955) - Parachutist #2
 Nechte to na mně (1955) - Bocek - corrector of the press
 Za 14 dní, prosím (1955, Short)
 Vzorný kinematograf Haška Jaroslava (1956)
 Větrná hora (1956)
 Kudy kam (1956) - Advocate
 Zaostřit, prosím! (1956) - Vrchní ucetní
 Robinsonka (1957) - Chandler
 Florenc 13.30 (1957) - Mr. Balík
 Mezi zemí a nebem (1958)
 Tři přání (1958) - Referent bytového úradu
 Ruka ruku neumyje (1958, Short)
 O lidech a tramvajích (1958, Short)
 Hvězda jede na jih (1958) - Trombonist Holpuch
 O věcech nadpřirozených (1959) - Psychiatrist #5 (segment "A Halo")
 Hlavní výhra (1959) - Instruktor autoskoly
 Zlepšovák (1960, Short)
 Páté oddělení (1961) - Inzenýr. Knape
 Ledoví muži (1961) - Mensík
 Každá koruna dobrá (1961) - False policeman #1
 Florián (1961)
 Muž z prvního století (1962) - Zarizovac v objednávárne
 Ticho, ticho, ticho (1962, TV Short) - Mr. N
 Tři chlapi v chalupě (1963) - Grandfather
  (1963) - Sirucek
 Einstein kontra Babinský (1964) - Ing. Frantisek Kolousek / Frantisek's father
 Půjčovna talentů (1964, TV Movie)
 Lov na mamuta (1964) - Reditel
 Člověk proti sobě (1965, TV Movie) - Director
 Zločin v dívčí škole (1966) - Lieutenant Boruvka
 Poklad byzantského kupce (1966) - Hudec - redactor
 Smrt za oponou (1966) - Laube
 Když má svátek Dominika (1967)
 Inzerát (1967, TV Movie)
 Amatér (1967, TV Movie)
 Dva tygři (1968) - Lebeda
 Hříšní lidé města pražského (1968, TV Series)
 Čest a sláva (1969) - Farár
 Šest černých dívek aneb Proč zmizel Zajíc (1969) - porucík Boruvka
 Blázinec v prvním poschodí (1969, TV Movie) - Jaroslav
 Zabil jsem Einsteina, pánové! (1970) - Professor Frank Pech
 Odvážná slečna (1970) - Josef Provazník
 Pan Tau (1970, TV Series) - Knacker
 Čtyři vraždy stačí, drahoušku! (1971) - George Camel
 Ženy v ofsajdu (1971) - Kastl
 Metráček (1971) - Pazout
 Slaměný klobouk (1971) - Uncle Vezinant
 F. L. Věk (1971, TV Series)
 Šest medvědů s Cibulkou (1972) - Cibulka
 Z nových pověstí českých: Dívčí válka (1972)
 Tři chlapi na cestách (1973) - deda Potucek
 Muž z Londýna (1974) - Sýkora
 Jáchyme, hoď ho do stroje! (1974) - vrátný v servisa Prouza
 Cirkus v cirkuse (1975) - Ceský porotce Lopata
 Honza málem králem (1977) - Robber
 Ať žijí duchové! (1977) - Antonín Jouza - vedoucí samoobsluhy
 Já to tedy beru, šéfe! (1978) - Filip Vanecek
 Kopretiny pro zámeckou paní (1981) - Tesík (voice, uncredited)
 Tři veteráni (1984) - 2. Skritek
 Fešák Hubert (1985) - Franc
 Velká filmová loupez (1986) - Janitor
 Jsi falešný hráč (1986)
 Cizím vstup povolen (1986)
  (1987)
 Trhala fialky dynamitem (1992) - Profesor
 Saturnin (1994) - Grandfather
 Hospoda (1996-1997, TV Series) - Alois Horácek - duchodce
 Nebát se a nakrást (1999)
 Návrat ztraceného ráje (1999) - Karel Rada
 Kameňák (2003) - Granddad Polácek
 Kameňák 2 (2004) - Granddad Polácek
 Kameňák 3 (2005) - Granddad Polácek
 Poslední plavky (2007) - Zacharias
 Bobule (2008) - Deda Adámek
 Ulice (2009, TV Series) - Boris Nekonecný
 2Bobule (2009) - Deda
 Nodame Kantâbire: Saishuu-gakushou - Zenpen (2009) - Regular Audience
 Pametnice (2009) - Lubomír Augusta
  (2012)
 Kamenák 4 (2013) - Granddad Polácek (final film role)

References

External links

Czech male film actors
Czech male television actors
1923 births
2015 deaths
People from Pelhřimov
20th-century Czech male actors
21st-century Czech male actors
Czech male voice actors
Czechoslovak male voice actors
Recipients of Medal of Merit (Czech Republic)
Recipients of the Thalia Award